Ambohimalaza Miray is a rural municipality in Analamanga Region, in the Central Highlands of Madagascar. It belongs to the district of Antananarivo Avaradrano and its population numbers to  15,988 in 2018.

It is located at 18 km East of Antananarivo along the National Road 2.

12 Fokontany (villages) belong to the municipality: Ambohimalaza Miray, Ambatofotsy, Fiadanana, Ambohitrandriana, Mahia, Masombahiny, Andranosoa, Ambatomalaza, Antentona, Ambohitremo, Atsimon’ Ambohidray and Andranonomby. 8 of these fokontany are connected to electricity.

Economy
The economy is based on agriculture.  Rice, corn, peanuts, beans, manioc are the main crops.

Rivers
The Ampasimbe river crosses this municipality from North to South.

Schools
There are 23 schools: 14 primary schools and 9 secondary schools.

References

Commune AMBOHIMALAZA MIRAY

External links

Populated places in Analamanga